Salam Abdulgasim oghlu Salamzade (7 March 1908 — 12 May 1997) was an Azerbaijani painter, People's Artist of the Azerbaijan SSR.

Biography 
Salam Salamzade was born on March 7, 1908, in Baku. In 1929, he graduated from Azerbaijan State Art College. Then he graduated from Moscow State Pedagogical University in 1932. In 1931–1932, he studied at the graduate school with director Rza Tahmasib, artist Rustam Mustafayev and film director Gamar Najafzade (Salamzade), who later became his wife.

He was the member of Azerbaijan Revolutionary Fine Arts Union since 1929. S. Salamzade was the author of a number of graphic paintings, portraits ("Portrait of Nariman Narimanov") and landscapes paintings of nature in Azerbaijan ("Old City", "Under the Sun", "Women going for water", "Tea Plants"), etc.

Salam Salamzade has repeatedly visited the Near and Middle East and created paintings depicting the life and nature of these countries. The series "In Arab countries" (1961–1970) is an example of this.

His solo exhibitions were organized in a number of cities around the world. His works are kept in National Art Museum of Azerbaijan, Azerbaijan State Art Gallery and other museums. 72 works by Salam Salamzade are preserved in the fund of Azerbaijan State Art Gallery. Salamzade's works have been exhibited in Poland, Germany, Romania, Hungary, France, Spain, Austria, Italy, Lebanon, Syria, Egypt, Tunisia, Libya, Iraq, Venezuela, Turkey and Iran.

S. Salamzade died on May 12, 1997, in Baku and buried in Alley of Honor.

Awards 
 Honored Art Worker of the Azerbaijan SSR
 People's Artist of the Azerbaijan SSR — 1 December 1982
 Order of the Badge of Honour — 9 June 1959
 Order of Friendship of Peoples — 5 March 1988

References 

Azerbaijani painters
1908 births
1997 deaths
Artists from Baku